Dad for a Day may refer to:
 Dad for a Day (1939 film), an Our Gang short comedy film
 Dad for a Day (2009 film), an Argentine sports romantic comedy film